Ryan P. Tatusko (born Match 27, 1985) is an American former professional baseball pitcher. He played for the Hanwha Eagles of the KBO League.

Professional career

Texas Rangers
Tatusko was the Texas Rangers eighteen-round pick in the 2007 Major League Baseball Draft.

Washington Nationals
Tatusko was traded from the Rangers along with Tanner Roark to the Washington Nationals in exchange for Cristian Guzmán on July 30, 2010.

Hanwha Eagles
Tatusko was sold to the Hanwha Eagles in June 2014.

References

External links

Career statistics and player information from Korea Baseball Organization

1985 births
Living people
People from Merrillville, Indiana
Baseball players from Indiana
KBO League pitchers
Hanwha Eagles players
Indiana State Sycamores baseball players
Spokane Indians players
Clinton LumberKings players
Bakersfield Blaze players
Frisco RoughRiders players
Harrisburg Senators players
Syracuse Chiefs players
Bravos de Margarita players
American expatriate baseball players in Venezuela
Leones de Ponce players
Indios de Mayagüez players
Estrellas Orientales players
American expatriate baseball players in the Dominican Republic
American expatriate baseball players in South Korea
Eau Claire Express players